This is the complete list of Pan American Games medalists in baseball from 1951 to 2019.

Medalists

Men's

Women's

References

Baseball